Counselor to the President is a title used by high-ranking political advisors to the president of the United States and senior members of the White House Office.

The current officeholder is Steve Ricchetti. The position should not be confused with the office of White House counsel, who is the chief legal advisor to the president and the White House, which is also an appointed position.

History

The position was created during the administration of Richard Nixon, where it was assigned Cabinet rank. It remained a Cabinet-level position until 1993.

During Nixon's presidency, eight people held the position, with there sometimes being two or three concurrent incumbents.

During the presidency of Gerald Ford, the post was shared by longtime communications advisor Robert T. Hartmann and national security aide John O. Marsh, with former United States secretary of commerce Rogers Morton briefly joining them as a domestic policy advisor in early 1976.

The position was vacant during the Jimmy Carter administration, as Carter initially left many senior White House positions unfilled (such as White House chief of staff) and preferred a smaller corps of advisers.

Edwin Meese held the position during the first term of President Ronald Reagan, and was highly influential inside the White House. Meese, Chief of Staff James Baker and Deputy Chief of Staff Michael Deaver were nicknamed "the troika" and considered the most influential advisors to the president. Meese became United States attorney general during Reagan's second term as president and the position was left vacant.

The position was left vacant in the first three years of President George H. W. Bush's term. In 1992, it was filled by Clayton Yeutter following his resignation as chairman of the Republican National Committee.

During the Bill Clinton administration, the post became much more focused on communications. Two of Clinton's counselors, David Gergen and Paul Begala, later became CNN political analysts.

During the administration of George W. Bush, the position oversaw the communications, media affairs, speechwriting, and press offices.

Under the Obama administration, the position was initially abolished and the duties of the office transferred to three senior advisors: David Axelrod, Pete Rouse, and Valerie Jarrett, who also held the title Assistant to the President for Intergovernmental Relations and Public Liaison. On January 6, 2011, President Obama appointed Rouse as counselor to the president where he was responsible for assisting the president and chief of staff with the day-to-day management of White House staff operations. John Podesta was the last person to hold the position before he left to join the Hillary Clinton presidential campaign of 2016 as chairman.

Soon after the 2016 election, President-elect Donald Trump announced his intention to name his campaign manager during the general election, Kellyanne Conway, to the position and his campaign CEO Steve Bannon as a senior counselor and chief strategist. With equivalent standing to the chief of staff and a portfolio that hewed closely to the pre-Clinton iteration of the position, Bannon was named to the Principals Committee of the National Security Council in a January 2017 executive order that also removed the director of national intelligence and the chairman of the Joint Chiefs of Staff from the committee. Following vociferous public opposition to the decision, Trump removed Bannon from the council in April 2017.

After Bannon's departure from the White House in August 2017, Johnny DeStefano was appointed to the job in February 2018, with responsibility for overseeing the offices of presidential personnel, political affairs, and public liaison.

In February 2020, it was announced that former White House communications director Hope Hicks would return to the White House Office in the role. In May 2020, White House staff secretary Derek Lyons was also given the title of counselor.

President Joe Biden named Steve Ricchetti, the chairman of his 2020 presidential campaign, as counselor to the president upon taking office. Jeffrey Zients was also given the title in his role as White House Coronavirus Response Coordinator.

List of counselors to the president

Counselors to President Richard Nixon (1969–1974) 
All of President Nixon's counselors were members of his Cabinet during their tenure.

Counselors to President Gerald Ford (1974–1977) 
All of President Fords's counselors were members of his Cabinet during their tenure.

Counselors to President Jimmy Carter (1977–1981) 
President Carter did not appoint any counselors during his tenure in the White House.

Counselors to President Ronald Reagan (1981–1989) 
President Reagan only appointed a counselor during his first term in the White House.

Counselors to President George H.W. Bush (1989–1993) 
President Bush only appointed a counselor, who was a member of his Cabinet during the last 11 months of his single term in the White House. The position was vacant for the first 3 years of his presidency.

Counselors to President Bill Clinton (1993–2001) 
President Clinton did not appoint a counselor for the first 5 months of his first term. He was the first president in over 20 years whose counselors were not members of his Cabinet.

Counselors to President George W. Bush (2001–2009) 
President Bush did not appoint a counselor for the last 2 1/2 years of his first term. He continued predecessors footsteps to not include his counselors as members of his Cabinet.

Counselors to President Barack Obama (2009–2017) 
President Obama did not appoint a counselor for the first 2 years of his first term and did not have one for the last 2 years of his second term. He continued predecessors' footsteps to not include his counselors as members of his Cabinet.

Counselors to President Donald Trump (2017–2021) 
President Trump was the first president since President Gerald Ford to have a counselor throughout all 4 years of his tenure.

Counselors to President Joe Biden (2021–present)

See also

Senior Advisor to the President of the United States
White House Counsel
White House Chief Strategist

References

White House Office
Executive Office of the President of the United States